Marcos Núñez (born 7 January 1961) is a Chilean table tennis coach and former international competitor.

Núñez represented Chile in table tennis at both the 1988 Summer Olympics in Seoul and 1992 Summer Olympics in Barcelona. He was also a doubles winner at the Latin American Championships twice and won two Pan American Games bronze medals, also in doubles.

References

External links
 

1961 births
Living people
Chilean male table tennis players
Olympic table tennis players of Chile
Table tennis players at the 1988 Summer Olympics
Table tennis players at the 1992 Summer Olympics
Pan American Games medalists in table tennis
Pan American Games bronze medalists for Chile
Table tennis players at the 1983 Pan American Games
Table tennis players at the 1987 Pan American Games
Medalists at the 1983 Pan American Games
Medalists at the 1987 Pan American Games
20th-century Chilean people